Al-Hasan II ibn Al-Qassim Guennoun was the thirteenth and the last Idrisid ruler and sultan of Morocco. He took over after Abu l-Aish Ahmad in 954 until his capture by the Umayyads in 974. He was then exiled to Córdoba, Spain where he died in 985.

Genealogy

References

Sources
 
 

Idrisid emirs
People from Fez, Morocco
985 deaths
10th-century monarchs in Africa
10th-century Moroccan people
Year of birth unknown
10th-century Arabs